The Bogert House is located in Bogota, Bergen County, New Jersey, United States. The house was listed on the National Register of Historic Places in 1983.

See also 
 National Register of Historic Places listings in Bergen County, New Jersey

References

Bogota, New Jersey
Houses in Bergen County, New Jersey
National Register of Historic Places in Bergen County, New Jersey
Stone houses in New Jersey
Houses on the National Register of Historic Places in New Jersey
New Jersey Register of Historic Places